HEAAN (Homomorphic Encryption for Arithmetic of Approximate Numbers) is an open source homomorphic encryption (HE) library which implements an approximate HE scheme proposed by Cheon, Kim, Kim and Song (CKKS).
The first version of HEAAN was published on GitHub on 15 May 2016, and later a new version of HEAAN with a bootstrapping algorithm
was released.
Currently, the latest version is Version 2.1.

CKKS plaintext space
Unlike other HE schemes, the CKKS scheme supports approximate arithmetics over complex numbers (hence, real numbers). 
To deal with the complex plaintext vector efficiently, Cheon et al. proposed plaintext encoding/decoding methods which exploits a ring isomorphism .

Encoding method
Given a plaintext vector  and a scaling factor , the plaintext vector is encoded as a polynomial 
by computing  where  denotes the coefficient-wise rounding function.

Decoding method
Given a message polynomial  and a scaling factor , the message polynomial  is decoded to a complex vector  by computing .

Here the scaling factor  enables us to control the encoding/decoding error which is occurred by the rounding process. Namely, one can obtain the approximate equation   by controlling  where  and  denote the encoding and decoding algorithm, respectively.

 , 
 ,

where  denotes the Hadamard product of the same-length vectors.
These properties guarantee the approximate correctness of the computations in the encoded state when the scaling factor  is chosen appropriately.

Algorithms
The CKKS scheme basically consists of those algorithms: key Generation, encryption, decryption, homomorphic addition and multiplication, and rescaling. For a positive integer , let  be the quotient ring of  modulo . These distributions, the initial modulus , and the ring dimension  are predetermined before the key generation phase.

Key generation
The key generation algorithm is following:
 Sample a secret polynomial .
 Output a secret key , a public key , and an evaluation key .

Encryption
The encryption algorithm is following:
 Sample an ephemeral secret polynomial .
 For a given message polynomial , output a ciphertext .

Decryption
The decryption algorithm is following:
 For a given ciphertext , output a message  .

The decryption outputs an approximate value of the original message, i.e., and the approximation error is determined by the choice of distributions . 
When considering homomorphic operations, the evaluation errors are also included in the approximation error. 
Basic homomorphic operations, addition and multiplication, are done as follows.

Homomorphic addition
The homomorphic addition algorithm is following:

Homomorphic multiplication
The homomorphic multiplication algorithm is following:
Output .

Note that the approximation error (on the message) exponentially grows up on the number of homomorphic multiplications. To overcome this problem, most of HE schemes usually use a modulus-switching technique which was introduced by Brakerski, Gentry and Vaikuntanathan.
In case of HEAAN, the modulus-switching procedure is called rescaling. The Rescaling algorithm is very simple compared to Brakerski-Gentry-Vaikuntanathan's original algorithm.
Applying the rescaling algorithm after a homomomorphic multiplication, the approximation error grows linearly, not exponentially.

Rescaling
The rescaling algorithm is following:
 Given a ciphertext  and a new modulus , output a rescaled ciphertext .

The total procedure of the CKKS scheme is as following: Each plaintext vector   which consists of complex (or real) numbers is firstly encoded as a polynomial   by the encoding method, and then encrypted as a ciphertext  . After several homomorphic operations, the resulting ciphertext is decrypted as a polynomial  and then decoded as a plaintext vector  which is the final output.

Security 
The IND-CPA security of the CKKS scheme is based on the hardness assumption of the ring learning with errors (RLWE) problem, the ring variant of very promising lattice-based hard problem Learning with errors (LWE).
Currently the best known attacks for RLWE over a power-of-two cyclotomic ring are general LWE attacks such as dual attack and primal attack.
The bit security of the CKKS scheme based on known attacks was estimated by Albrecht's LWE estimator.

Library 
Version 1.0, 1.1 and 2.1 have been released so far. Version 1.0 is the first implementation of the CKKS scheme without bootstrapping.
In the second version, the bootstrapping algorithm was attached so that users are able to address large-scale homomorphic computations.

References 

Cryptographic primitives
Public-key cryptography
Lattice-based cryptography
Homomorphic encryption